Canoinhas is a Brazilian municipality, in the north plateau of the State of Santa Catarina. Its latitude is 26°10'38" South, its longitude is 50°23'24" West, and its altitude is 839 meters. The population was estimated in 2020 at 54,480 inhabitants.

The area of the city is 1143.6 square kilometers.

The city's economy primarily depends on agriculture and logging.

The city is also known worldwide as the world capital of Erva Mate, a herb used in a traditional drink called chimarrao, the herb Ilex Paraguariensis has been a main export of the region for quite some time.

The people of Canoinhas are mainly German-Brazilians, some of the best-known families are the Kellners, the Fucks, the Wolffs, among others.

History
Francisco de Paula Pereira is known to be the founder of the town, it was a popular stop for immigrants from Parana looking for the famous Erva Mate

Twin towns – sister cities

Canoinhas is twinned with:
 Sterling, United States

References

Municipalities in Santa Catarina (state)